Pope Michael V of Alexandria, 71st Pope of Alexandria and Patriarch of the See of St. Mark. During his papacy, he returned the relics of Saint Macarius of Egypt from village of Shabsheer to the Nitrian Desert on 19 Mesori.

He is commemorated in the Coptic Synaxarion on the 3rd day of Parmouti.

Coptic Orthodox saints
12th-century Coptic Orthodox popes of Alexandria
1146 deaths
People from Dakahlia Governorate